Paul Temple's Triumph is a 1950 British crime film directed by Maclean Rogers and starring John Bentley, Dinah Sheridan and Jack Livesey. It was the third in the series of four Paul Temple films made at Nettlefold Studios, and was an adaptation of the Francis Durbridge radio serial News of Paul Temple (1939). Temple is on the trail of a gang of international criminals trying to steal atomic secrets.

Cast

Critical reception
TV Guide called it "an uninvolving series entry", but the Radio Times wrote, "perhaps too many scenes are staged in hotel rooms, but the plot rattles along, with Teutonic boffins, petrol smugglers, snooping reporters and French singers armed with doped cigarettes distracting the Temples from cracking the case."

References

External links

1950 films
British crime films
1950 crime films
Films directed by Maclean Rogers
Films based on radio series
Films produced by Ernest G. Roy
British black-and-white films
Films shot at Nettlefold Studios
1950s English-language films
1950s British films